Macomb County is a county located in the eastern portion of the U.S. state of Michigan, bordering Lake St. Clair, and is part of northern Metro Detroit. As of the 2020 Census, the population was 881,217, making it the third-most populous county in the state. The county seat is Mt. Clemens. Macomb County is part of the Detroit-Warren-Dearborn, MI Metropolitan Statistical Area. The city of Detroit is located south of the county's southern border. Macomb County contains 27 cities, townships and villages, including three of the top ten most-populous municipalities in Michigan as of the 2010 census: Warren (#3), Sterling Heights (#4) and Clinton Township (#10). Most of this population is concentrated south of Hall Road (M-59), one of the county's main thoroughfares.

History
The Ojibwe lived in the area for centuries before European contact and were preceded by other cultures of ancient indigenous peoples.

The first European colonizers were French, and they arrived in the area during the 17th century. Other early settlers were French fur trappers, who sometimes married Ojibwe women, and Jesuit missionaries. A Moravian colony was established in the county in the late 18th century. In addition to the original French and English settlers, later immigrants included Germans, Belgians, and others from Europe.  In the 19th century, the county received many European-American migrants from New York and New England, who were attracted to the area for land and booming jobs in the lumber and other resource industries.

Macomb County was formally organized on January 15, 1818, as the third county in the Michigan Territory. The county was named in honor of Detroit-born Alexander Macomb, Jr., a highly decorated veteran of the War of 1812 and hero of the Battle of Plattsburg. He was made Commanding General of the U.S. Army in 1828.

As was typical in development, the county at first encompassed a much larger area than at present. As population increased in the area, the state legislature removed territory in 1819 and 1820 to form the counties of Oakland, Lapeer, Genesee, and St. Clair.

In May 2008, Macomb County voters approved the inclusion of a County Executive in a new charter to be submitted to the voters by 2010. A charter commission was elected in November 2008 to draft a charter for submission to Governor Granholm, which was submitted and approved and placed on the November 2009 ballot. The Charter passed with a 60.4% to 39.6% margin.

Geography

The county's southeastern border with Canada is located across Lake St. Clair.

Lake St. Clair borders the county on the east.

Macomb County is mostly considered a part of Southeast Michigan. However, the far northern parts of the county, including Richmond and Armada, are often considered to be part of Michigan's Thumb region.

The county comprises mostly rural/agricultural communities to the north and a mix of suburban and urban areas to the south.

Adjacent counties
By land
 St. Clair County, Michigan - northeast
 Lapeer County, Michigan - northwest
 Oakland County, Michigan - west
 Wayne County, Michigan - south
By water

 Lambton County, Ontario, Canada - southeast

Demographics

As of the 2010 United States Census, there were 840,978 people living in the county. 85.4% were White, 8.6% Black or African American, 3.0% Asian, 0.3% Native American, 0.6% of some other race and 2.1% of two or more races. 2.3% were Hispanic or Latino (of any race). 14.8% were of German, 14.3% Polish, 11.1% Italian, 6.5% Irish and 5.9% American ancestry.

In 2000, 87.6%  of county residents spoke only English at home; 1.7% spoke Italian, 1.4% Polish, 1.2% Spanish, 1.1% Arabic, and 1.1% Syriac.

European ethnic groups that have settled in Macomb County since the late 20th century include Bosnians, Albanians and Macedonians.

Among Asian ethnic groups, eight numbered over 1,000 people in Macomb County. They were Arabs, Asian Indians, Chaldeans, Filipinos, Chinese, Koreans, Vietnamese, and Hmong. Pakistanis are also represented in Macomb County's population.

Native American tribes had more than 2,478 residents in Macomb County in 2000.

In 2000, there were 309,203 households, out of which 31.10% had children under the age of 18 living with them, 54.30% were married couples living together, 10.10% had a female householder with no husband present, and 31.80% were non-families. 26.90% of all households were made up of individuals, and 10.30% had someone living alone who was 65 years of age or older.  The average household size was 2.52 and the average family size was 3.09.

In 2000, the age distribution of the county was as follows: 24.10% under the age of 18, 8.00% from 18 to 24, 31.50% from 25 to 44, 22.80% from 45 to 64, and 13.70% who were 65 years of age or older.  The median age was 37 years. For every 100 females, there were 96.00 males.  For every 100 females age 18 and over, there were 92.90 males.

The median income for a household in the county was $52,102, and the median income for a family was $62,816. Males had a median income of $48,303 versus $30,215 for females. The per capita income for the county was $24,446.  About 4.00% of families and 5.60% of the population were below the poverty line, including 7.00% of those under age 18 and 6.40% of those age 65 or over.

According to the 2006 American Community Survey, the average family size was 3.15. The population of 25 and over was 571,463. 86.9% of that population had graduated from high school, and 21% of the population had a Bachelor's degree or higher. About 14.3% of that population was disabled. 12.5% of Macomb's population could speak another language at home.

Of Michigan's five largest counties, Macomb experienced the most population growth (102.5%) in the postwar years of accelerating suburban development, between 1950 and 1960. Its population has continued to grow to the present day, albeit at a slower pace since 1980.

Parks and recreation
Macomb County is home to more than 130 parks covering  managed by the state, regional, county, and local government. There are four major public parks in the County - Freedom Hill County Park, Macomb Orchard Trail, Lake St. Clair Metropark, and Stony Creek Metropark.  The county also has 31 miles of shoreline and over 100 marinas.

Government

The county government operates the jail, maintains rural roads, operates the major local courts, keeps files of deeds and mortgages, maintains vital records, administers public health regulations, and participates with the state in the provision of welfare and other social services. The county board of commissioners, which for the 2019–21 term is chaired by Bob Smith, controls the budget and creates and adopts ordinances and resolutions related to County functions.  In Michigan, most local government functions — police and fire, building and zoning, tax assessment, street maintenance, etc. — are the responsibility of individual cities and townships.

The Macomb Intermediate School District serves all school districts based in the county.

Elected officials
 County Executive: Mark A. Hackel (Democrat)
 Prosecuting Attorney: Peter Lucido (Republican)
 Sheriff: Anthony Wickersham (Democrat)
 County Clerk/Register of Deeds: Anthony Forlini (Republican)
 County Treasurer: Larry Rocca (Republican)
 Public Works Commissioner: Candice Miller (Republican)
 Macomb County Board of Commissioners: 13 members, elected from districts (5 Democrats, 8 Republicans)
 Circuit Court: 13 judges (non-partisan)
 Probate Court: 2 judges (non-partisan)

Politics
Macomb County has shown Republican tendencies in statewide elections, while tending to favor Democratic candidates at the federal and local level. Since the 2010s, Macomb County has shifted towards the Republicans, and after the 2020 elections the party gained control of the Board of Commissioners for the first time as well as four of the five countywide offices. The county gained fame in the 1980s and '90s as a bellwether of state and national politics. Macomb's large cohort of middle-class, socially conservative whites gave it one of the nation's most prominent concentrations of "Reagan Democrats". Outsider candidates with a conservative-populist bent have done well there in the past, such as Pat Buchanan in 1992 and Donald Trump in 2016 and 2020. Macomb County voters were primarily responsible for the failure of the Regional Transit Authority proposal to create a public transit system in the Metropolitan Detroit region.

The more populated communities south of M-59 (Warren, Sterling Heights, Clinton Charter Township), closer to Detroit city proper are friendlier to Democrats. Warren leans Democratic, while Sterling Heights, after voting for Barack Obama in 2012, voted for Trump by about 12 points in both 2016 and 2020, but in 2018, voted for Gretchen Whitmer and Debbie Stabenow by 3 points, and Clinton Charter Township after voting for Obama in 2012, voted for Trump in 2016, but swung back to Whitmer and Stabenow in 2018 and Joe Biden in 2020. The communities north of M-59 further removed from Detroit are more strongly Republican, all backing Trump in 2016 and 2020 and Bill Schuette in 2018.

Transportation

Air
Coleman A. Young International Airport (DET) (Detroit) - General aviation only
Detroit Metropolitan Wayne County Airport (DTW) (Romulus) - Major commercial airport, a hub for Delta Air Lines and Spirit Airlines
Oakland County International Airport (PTK) Waterford Township) - Charter passenger facility
St. Clair County International Airport (near Port Huron, Michigan) - A minor international airport on the Canada–US border.
Selfridge Air National Guard Base (Mount Clemens) - Military airbase
Romeo State Airport (2 miles east of Romeo, Michigan) - Small general aviation airport within Macomb County
Ray Community Airport (2 miles southeast of Ray, Michigan) - Small general aviation airport within Macomb County
Marine City Airport (4 miles west of Marine City, Michigan) - Small general aviation airport in neighboring Saint Clair County
Oakland/Troy Airport (2 miles east of Troy, Michigan) - Small general aviation airport in neighboring Oakland County

Major highways
 runs –west through Detroit and serves Ann Arbor to the west (where it continues to Chicago) and Port Huron to the northeast.  The stretch of the current I-94 freeway from Ypsilanti to Detroit was one of the first American limited-access freeways.  Henry Ford built it to link his factories at Willow Run and Dearborn during World War II.  It was called the Willow Run Expressway.
 runs east-west from the junction of I-96, I-275, and M-5 to I-94, providing a route through the northern suburbs of Detroit.
 is a major road that runs from Marysville to downtown Detroit. The portion of the road between 23 Mile Road and New Haven Road is not numbered. Between New Haven Road and Main Street in the city of Richmond, the road is part of M-19. Between Richmond and Marysville the road is not numbered.
 starts in New Haven goes up Gratiot to Richmond. The route leaves Gratiot and goes northwest through Richmond and then north through Memphis. Then it goes north through St. Clair and Sanilac Counties and ends at M-142 between Bad Axe and Harbor Beach in Huron County.
 begins as part of 23 Mile Road, east of I-94, and ends in Marysville.
 which is called the Van Dyke Freeway and Christopher Columbus Freeway from 18 Mile Road in Sterling Heights to 27  Mile Road in Washington Township. It is also called the POW/MIA Memorial Freeway from 27  Mile Road in Washington Township to the freeway's end at 34 Mile Road in Bruce Township, however, it is locally known as the Van Dyke Freeway. It continues as Van Dyke Road or Van Dyke Avenue north to Port Austin and south through Warren to Gratiot Avenue in Detroit.
 (Veterans Memorial Freeway) from Utica to Pontiac, continues east as Hall Road to Gratiot Avenue and as William P. Rosso Highway to its terminus at I-94 and west as various surface roads to I-96 near Howell
 (Groesbeck Highway) begins in Detroit at Gratiot (M-3) and ends at Hall Road (M-59).
, known by many due to the film 8 Mile, forms the dividing line between Detroit on the south and the suburbs of Macomb and Oakland counties on the north. It is also known as Baseline Road outside of Detroit, because it coincides with the baseline used in surveying Michigan; that baseline is also the boundary for many Michigan counties.

Other roads

Jefferson Avenue is a scenic highway that runs parallel to the shore of the Detroit River and Lake St. Clair. It is also the principal thoroughfare for the Grosse Pointes, where it is called Lake Shore Drive.
"Mile" roads: Surface street navigation in Metro Detroit is commonly anchored by "mile roads," major east-west surface streets that are spaced at one-mile intervals and increment as one travels north and away from the city center. Mile roads sometimes have two names, the numeric name (ex. 15 Mile Road) used in Macomb County and a local name (ex. Maple Road) used in Oakland County mostly.

Rail
Into the end of the 1950s the New York Central Railroad operated multiple trains from Mackinaw City at the north end of Michigan's Lower Peninsula, with stops at Warren station. The last Bay City to Detroit passenger train through Warren stopped on March 19, 1964.

Communities

Cities

 Center Line
 Eastpointe (formerly East Detroit)
 Fraser
 Grosse Pointe Shores (partial)
 Memphis (partial)
 Mount Clemens (county seat)
 New Baltimore
 Richmond (partial)
 Roseville
 St. Clair Shores
 Sterling Heights
 Utica
 Warren

Villages
 Armada
 New Haven
 Romeo

Charter townships
Chesterfield Charter Township
Clinton Charter Township
Harrison Charter Township
Shelby Charter Township
Washington Charter Township

Civil townships
Armada Township
Bruce Township
Lenox Township
Macomb Township
Ray Township
Richmond Township

Unincorporated communities

 Anchor Bay Gardens
 Anchor Bay Harbor
 Anchor Bay Shores
 Broad Acres
 Cady
 Chesterfield
 Chesterfield Shores
 Clifton Mill
 Davis
 Lakeside
 Lottivue
 Macomb
 Meade
 Milton
 Mount Vernon
 Point Lakeview
 Preston Corners
 Ray Center
 Saint Clair Haven
 Sebille Manor
 Shelby
 Waldenburg
 Washington
 Wolcott Mills
 Yates

Education
School districts:

 Almont Community Schools
 Anchor Bay School District
 Armada Area Schools
 Center Line Public Schools
 Chippewa Valley Schools
 Clintondale Community Schools
 East Detroit Public Schools
 Fitzgerald Public Schools
 Fraser Public Schools
 Lakeview Public Schools
 Lake Shore Public Schools
 L'Anse Creuse Public Schools
 Memphis Community Schools
 Mount Clemens Community School District
 New Haven Community Schools
 Oxford Area Community Schools
 Richmond Community Schools
 Rochester Community School District
 Romeo Community Schools
 Roseville Community Schools
 South Lake Schools
 Utica Community Schools
 Van Dyke Public Schools
 Warren Consolidated Schools
 Warren Woods Public Schools

Notable people

Actors and actresses
Dean Cain, actor, Mount Clemens
Dave Coulier, actor/comedian, St. Clair Shores
Adrienne Frantz, actress and singer, Mount Clemens, Michigan
Faye Grant, actress, St. Clair Shores
Kathleen Rose Perkins, actress, New Baltimore
Crystal Reed, actress, Roseville, Michigan

Athletes
George Herbert Allen, coached in the NFL and USFL, St. Clair Shores
David Booth, NHL player, Washington Township
Kyle Connor, NHL player for the Winnipeg Jets
Dave Debol, NHL player, St. Clair Shores
Danny DeKeyser, NHL Player, Macomb County
Joe DeLamielleure, NFL Player, Center Line
John DiGiorgio, NFL Player, Macomb, Shelby Township
Sheldon Dries, NHL player, Macomb Twp.
Denny Felsner, NHL player, Warren
Derian Hatcher, NHL player, Sterling Heights
Kevin Hatcher, NHL player, Sterling Heights
Pat Hentgen, MLB player, Fraser
Bryan Herta, race car driver, Warren
Matt Hunwick, NHL player, Warren
Ron Kramer, NFL player, Eastpointe
Craig Krenzel, NFL player, Sterling Heights
Chad LaRose, NHL player, Fraser
John Mazza, PBA bowler, Shelby Township
Shirley Muldowney, race car driver, Armada
John Smoltz, MLB player, Warren
Jim Sorgi, NFL player, Fraser
Matt Taormina, NHL player, Warren
Michele Van Gorp, WNBA player from Duke University, Warren
Doug Weight, NHL player, Warren
Mark Wells, member of the 1980 Olympic hockey team, St. Clair Shores
Johnny White, race car driver, Warren
Ernie Whitt, MLB player, Roseville
Frank Zombo, NFL player, Sterling Heights
Kyle Cook, NFL player, Macomb Twp.
Steve Oleksy, NHL player, Chesterfield Twp.
Tyler Conklin, NFL player, Chesterfield Twp.
Sean Murphy-Bunting, NFL Player, Macomb Twp.

Musicians
Kid Rock, Romeo
Mitch Ryder, Roseville
Justin Jeffre, (98 Degrees), Mount Clemens
Uncle Kracker, Harrison Township
Eminem, Warren
Fred 'Sonic' Smith, St. Clair Shores
Alice Cooper, Eastpointe
Chuck Inglish, Mt. Clemens

Other
Joe Cada, professional poker player, Shelby Township
Dick Enberg, sportscaster, Armada
Martha Griffiths, Lieutenant Governor of Michigan (1983–1991), Armada
Alex Groesbeck, politician, Warren
Butch Hartman, creator of the cartoon show The Fairly OddParents, New Baltimore
Ian Hornak, Artist, Mount Clemens
George F. Lewis, proprietor of newspapers
Jerry M. Linenger, NASA astronaut, Eastpointe
Carey Torrice, politician, Clinton Township
Howard Wiest, Chief Justice of the Michigan Supreme Court, Washington Township

See also

 List of Michigan State Historic Sites in Macomb County, Michigan
National Register of Historic Places listings in Macomb County, Michigan

References

External links
Macomb County - Official Website
Macomb County Library

View Fiscal Transparency Data for Macomb County

 
Macomb County
Metro Detroit
1818 establishments in Michigan Territory
Populated places established in 1818